Senegalia gaumeri is a species of plant in the family Fabaceae. It is found only in Mexico.

References

gaumeri
Endemic flora of Mexico
Taxonomy articles created by Polbot